This is a list of nominated candidates for the Green Party of Canada in the 2015 Canadian federal election. The Green Party is expected to nominate candidates in all 338 ridings.

Candidate statistics

Newfoundland and Labrador - 7 seats

Prince Edward Island - 4 seats

Nova Scotia - 11 seats

New Brunswick - 10 seats

Quebec - 78 seats

Ontario - 121 seats

Manitoba - 14 seats

Saskatchewan - 14 seats

Alberta - 34 seats

British Columbia - 42 seats

Yukon - 1 seat

Northwest Territories - 1 seat

Nunavut - 1 seat

See also
Results of the Canadian federal election, 2011
Results by riding for the Canadian federal election, 2011

References

Green Party Candidates

External links
 Green Party of Canada website

 
Green Party of Canada candidates in Canadian Federal elections
candidates in the 2015 Canadian federal election